The Joseph A. Hemann House in Cincinnati, Ohio, was built in 1870  by Joseph A. Hemann (1816-1897) and served as his residence for about ten years. It is located in Hamilton County in the neighborhood of Clifton on the corner of West McMillan and Hollister. Mr. Hemann was the founder of the Cincinnati Volksfreund in 1850.

In April 1980, because the house represents a distinctive period in urban vernacular architecture, it was placed on the National Register of Historic Places (Listing Reference Number 80003057).

References

1870 establishments in Ohio
German-American culture in Ohio
German-American history
Houses in Cincinnati
Houses completed in 1870
Houses on the National Register of Historic Places in Ohio
National Register of Historic Places in Cincinnati